Preeti Sudan is a retired Indian bureaucrat who served as Health Secretary of India from October 2017 to July 2020. She has been the key strategist in times of the COVID-19 pandemic.

Early life and education
Sudan has degrees in Economics and Social Policy and Planning from the London School of Economics. She has been trained in public finance management in Washington.

Career
A 1983 batch IAS officer of the Andhra cadre, Sudan was previously a Secretary, Department of Food and Public Distribution. Apart from this, she has served at various central and state level positions such as a Joint Secretary in the Ministry of Defense as well as in position relating to disaster management and tourism. She has been a key functionary in the planning and implementation of the Ayushman Bharat Yojana, a scheme of the Indian government's National Health Policy aiming to provide free health coverage at the secondary and tertiary level to India's bottom 40% poor and vulnerable population. She has also served as consultant in the World Bank.

Since 2020, Sudan has been serving as a member of the Independent Panel for Pandemic Preparedness and Response (IPPR), an independent group examining how the World Health Organization (WHO) and countries handled the COVID-19 pandemic, co-chaired by Helen Clark and Ellen Johnson Sirleaf.

Other activities
 Partnership for Maternal, Newborn & Child Health (PMNCH), Member of the Board

References 

Indian Administrative Service officers
Year of birth missing (living people)
Living people